Nabi Habeel Mosque, or "Mosque of the Prophet Abel", is a shrine dedicated to Habeel, located on the west mountains of Damascus, near the Zabadani Valley, overlooking the villages of the Barada river (Wadi Barada), in Syria, the Levant.

Description 

This mosque is believed to contain the grave of Abel (Arabic: Hābīl) the son of Adam, as believed by Muslims, who are frequent visitors of this mosque for ziyarat. The mosque was built by Ottoman Wali Ahmad Pasha in 1599, and it is said to have 40 mihrabs. As the story goes, Abel was killed by his brother Cain (Arabic: Qābīl), which is known to be the first homicide of mankind.

The mosque is also believed to be a ritual site for the Druze.

See also 
 Holiest sites in Islam
 Holiest sites in Islam (Shia)
 Al-Nabi Shayth, Lebanon
 Baab Sagheer
 Sayyidah Ruqayya Mosque
 Sayyidah Zaynab Mosque

References 

16th-century mosques
Religious buildings and structures completed in 1599
Cain and Abel
Ottoman mosques in Syria
Mausoleums in Syria
Mosques in Damascus
Architecture in Syria
Habeel
Mosque buildings with domes